WCDK (106.3 FM) is a radio station licensed to Cadiz, Ohio, United States, the station serves the Steubenville, Ohio and Wheeling, West Virginia, area.  The station is currently owned by Cody Barack, through licensee Ohio Midland Newsgroup, LLC. WCDK broadcasts a classic rock music radio format.

WCDK broadcasts from facilities along Ohio Route 150 in Dillonvale, Ohio. It is the flagship station for Steubenville High School football.

History
The roots of this station date back to March 17, 1980, when the construction permit was first applied for.  The application was granted on May 23, 1983 to Cadiz Broadcasting, Inc., a company headed by Randall M. O'Grady.  However, the station would not sign on the air under this company's ownership, largely due to its inability to acquire a suitable tower site from which to broadcast.

The station went on the air as WFNN on 1990-08-17.  On 1990-10-08, the station changed its call sign to WWYS. On 1993-09-01 to the current WCDK,

On August 2, 2017 Priority Communications of Ohio filed an application with the FCC to sell WEIR and WCDK to Ohio Midland Newsgroup, LLC of Bellaire, Ohio. The company is headed by Cody Barack and has no other broadcast interests. The sale was consummated on October 31, 2017 at a price of $700,000.

References

External links
1984 Broadcasting and Cable Yearbook

CDK
Classic rock radio stations in the United States
Radio stations established in 1990